1984 Academy Awards may refer to:

 56th Academy Awards, the Academy Awards ceremony that took place in 1984
 57th Academy Awards, the 1985 ceremony honoring the best in film for 1984